Neurea Parish, New South Wales is a civil parish of Gordon County, New South Wales, a Cadastral divisions of New South Wales.

References

Parishes of Gordon County (New South Wales)